The table below lists the judgments of the Constitutional Court of South Africa delivered in 2006.

The members of the court at the start of 2006 were Chief Justice Pius Langa, Deputy Chief Justice Dikgang Moseneke, and judges Tholie Madala, Yvonne Mokgoro, Sandile Ngcobo, Kate O'Regan, Albie Sachs, Thembile Skweyiya, Johann van der Westhuizen and Zak Yacoob. The seat left vacant by the retirement of Arthur Chaskalson in 2005 was filled by the appointment of Bess Nkabinde in January.

References
 
 

2006
Constitutional Court
Constitutional Court of South Africa